Fatubessi may refer to:

 Fatubessi, Ainaro, one of the Sucos of East Timor in Maubisse, district Ainaro
 Fatubessi, Ermera, suco in Hatulia, district Ermera, East Timor